Instabase is a technology company headquartered in San Francisco.  The company provides an application platform that can be used to understand unstructured data and automate business processes.

History 
Instabase was founded by Anant Bhardwaj, when he was a Ph.D. student at the Massachusetts Institute of Technology. In July 2015, he moved to San Francisco where the company is currently located. Instabase announced on August 31, 2015 that it raised $3.75 million from Greylock Partners and New Enterprise Associates. On June 14, 2017, CNBC reported that Instabase raised a $23.2 million Series A led by Martin Casado of Andreessen Horowitz. Instabase announced its Series B of $105 million on Oct 21, 2019, led by Index Ventures and joined by Spark Capital, Tribe Capital, SC Ventures and Glynn Capital, which valued the company at over $1 billion. In this announcement, for the first time Instabase publicly disclosed the details of what the company does and who are its customers.

Acquisitions 
On February 14, 2018, Instabase announced that it had acquired Cloudstitch, a web development platform that uses spreadsheets as the back-end.

References

Further reading
 

Technology companies established in 2015
Software companies based in California
Companies based in San Francisco
2015 establishments in California
2015 establishments in the United States
Software companies of the United States
Software companies established in 2015
American companies established in 2015